Samkhret-Chiprani or Xussar Tsipran is a settlement in the Dzau district of South Ossetia, Georgia.

See also
 Dzau District

Notes

References  

Populated places in Dzau District